Armenia TV, is one of the leading TV channels in Armenia. In 2012, Armenia TV became the first TV channel in Armenia to launch Full HD broadcasting. By the first half of 2020, Armenia TV was the highest rated among news, fiction movies, TV series, comedy, and music shows.

History 
Armenia TV was founded in 1997 by Gerard Cafesjian and Bagrat Sargsyan. Broadcasting was launched on 13 January 1998 in 24-hour regime.

In 2012, followed by technical modernization, broadcasting was tested and was officially launched in 2013.

In 2016, Armenia TV released the first Armenian 4K TV show – "Ancient Kings".
 
In 2019, the owner of 100% shares is Artur Janibekyan – founder and general producer of Comedy Club Production and general manager of Gazprom Media Entertainment TV. In November 2019, Armenia TV announced technical modernization and plans to launch 4K format.

By 2020, Armenia TV's program list included TV shows, TV series, situation comedy shows, news shows, Armenian and international movies.

Staff 
Incomplete list of Armenia TV team members, involved in various TV shows, programs and movies:

International Projects 
Armenia TV is the rights owner of broadcasting Champions League, UEFA Nations League, Euro 2020 and World Football Tournament Qualification games in Armenia. In June 2019, Armenia announced purchase of license for Euro 2020.
International partners of Armenia TV include Walt Disney Company, Universal Studios, 20th Century Fox, Warner Brothers, Sony, Talpa, Endemol, TV Globo, etc. Armenia TV implemented the following international formats – "The Voice of Armenia", "The Brainiest", "What? Where? When?", "Deal or No Deal", "Fort Boyard", etc.

Armenia Premium 
On 14 September 2015, Armenia TV in cooperation with Ucom, launched 6 new cable channels, available to Ucom users. The channels did not include advertisements, TV shows were broadcast one day earlier, as well as some shows were released never included in original Armenia TV.

Programming

References

External links
 

Television stations in Armenia
Television channels and stations established in 1997